Ha-201 may refer to:

, a class of Imperial Japanese Navy submarines constructed in 1945
, an Imperial Japanese Navy submarine commissioned in 1945 and scuttled in 1946